Conkles Hollow State Nature Preserve is a deep, cool gorge, which is only 100 feet wide in places and is considered by some to be the deepest in Ohio.  The cliffs above the gorge are about 200 feet tall.  The valley floor is covered in multiple difference species of plants, such as ferns, hemlock, and other wildflowers. It is located within Hocking Hills State Park.

See also 
Hocking Hills
Hocking Hills State Park

References 

Protected areas established in 1925
Protected areas of Hocking County, Ohio
1925 establishments in Ohio
Ohio State Nature Preserves